Boyajian may refer to:

Albert A. Boyajian (born 1940), American business leader and founder of the Armenian American Political Action Committee
Garen Boyajian (born 1987), Canadian actor
Hampartsoum Boyadjian (1867-1915), also known as Murad the Great), Armenian militia member and political activist
Tabetha S. Boyajian, American astronomer
Zabelle C. Boyajian (1873-1957), Ottoman Armenian painter, writer, and translator
Boyajian family, the character family depicted in the 2002 American television film A Christmas Visitor

Armenian-language surnames